Paula Romero Chaparro (born 29 May 1998) is a Spanish footballer who plays as a defender for Sporting de Huelva.

Club career
Romero started her career at Sporting de Huelva.

References

External links
Profile at La Liga

1998 births
Living people
Women's association football defenders
Spanish women's footballers
Footballers from Huelva
Sporting de Huelva players
UD Collerense (women) players
Primera División (women) players
Segunda Federación (women) players